

Calendar 
The following are the scheduled events of the ancient game of Go for the year 2011 throughout the world. Most of the Go tournaments are held in Asia.

January
14 – Choi Cheol-han defeats Kong Jie in the final game of the 12th Nongshim Cup, giving Team Korea the title.
27 – Choi Cheol-han sweeps Lee Taehyun to win the 15th Chunwon title.

February
14 – Choi Cheol-han defeats Lee Chang-ho three games to one in the 54th Guksu.
16 – Xie Yimin defends her title against Umezawa Yukari in the 14th Female Kisei.
18 – Rui Naiwei defeats Cho Hyeyeon to win the 12th Female Myungin, her seventh consecutive Female Myungin title.
23 – Piao Wenyao wins the 16th LG Cup, his first international tournament. Wenyao was promoted to 9 dan for winning.

March
2 – Li He wins the 2nd Female Mingren. Yang Dingxin wins the 5th RICOH Xinxiu Cup.
5 – Cho U wins the 30th NEC Cup, his third NEC Cup title.
7 – Kong Jie defeats Heo Yeongho in the final game of the 1st Zhaoshang Cup, propelling Team China to a 6–4 victory over Team Korea.
8 – Rui Naiwei wins the 16th Female Guksu, her third straight Female Guksu title.
11 – Gu Lingyi wins the 10th South-West Qiwang. Cho U wins the 35th Kisei.
18 – Fan Tingyu wins the 18th Xinren Wang.
20 – Li He wins her second title of the year after defeating Li Xiaoxi for the 5th Female Xinren Wang.
21 – Park Junghwan defeats Paek Hongsuk in the 29th KBS Cup finals.
25 – Xie Yimin keeps her Female Meijin title by beating Chiaki Mukai two to one in the finals of the 23rd Female Meijin.
26 – Takao Shinji becomes the 4th Daiwa Cup Grand Champion.
27 – Yamada Kimio wins the 58th NHK Cup.

April
5 – Lee Sedol defeats Kang Yootaek in the finals of the 6th Siptan.
7 – Pak Yeong-hun wins the 12th Maxim Cup.
9 – Li He's victory over Park Jieun completes the sweep for Team China in the 1st Huanglongshi Cup.
13 – Chen Yaoye defends his Tianyuan title by defeating Zhou Hexi two to zero in the finals of the 25th Tianyuan.
17 – Chen Shiyuan wins the Zhonghuan Cup.
24 – Tan Xiao wins the 11th RICOH Cup.
28 – Lee Sedol defeats Gu Li in the finals of the 3rd BC Card Cup.
29 – Iyama Yuta wins the 49th Judan, his second major title.

May
17 – Zhong Wenjing wins the 23rd CCTV Cup.
18 – Iyama Yuta defeats Gu Li and Lee Sedol to win the 1st Bosai Cup.
24 – Chen Shiyuan wins the 10th Tianyuan.

June
10 – Kong Jie defeats Paek Hongsuk in the final of the 23rd Asian TV Cup.
19 – Zhou Junxun wins the 11th Donggang Cup against Xiao Zhenghao.
30 – Lee Sedol wins the 8th Chunlan Cup, defeating Xie He 2–1.

July
18 – Xiao Zhenghao wins his first Siyuan Cup after besting Wang Yuanjun in the final.
21 – Honinbo Dowa Keigo Yamashita defends his Honinbo title by defeating Naoki Hane for the second term in-a-row.
23 – Cho Chikun, holder of most titles won in Nihon Ki-in history, wins the inaugural edition of the Igo Masters Cup.

August
14 – Park Junghwan becomes the youngest holder of the Fujitsu Cup after defeating Qiu Jun in the final.
20 – Pak Yeong-hun wins the 2nd World Meijin.
29 – Naoki Hane wins his first Gosei title by defeating previous holder Hideyuki Sakai.
30 – Lin Zhihan defends his Guoshou title against Xiao Zhenghao.

Tournament results

See also 

 List of Go organizations
 Go players
 Go professionals

References

External links 
 Igo-Kisen, all yearly Go results